The 2015 Summit League men's soccer tournament was the tenth edition of the tournament. It determined Summit League's automatic berth into the 2015 NCAA Division I Men's Soccer Championship.

The Denver Pioneers won the tournament, defeating the Oral Roberts Golden Eagles in the championship match.

Qualification 

The top four teams in the Summit League based on their conference regular season records qualified for the tournament.

Bracket

Schedule

Semifinals

Final

Statistical leaders

Top goalscorers

Tournament Best XI

See also 
 2015 The Summit League men's soccer season
 2015 NCAA Division I men's soccer season
 2015 NCAA Division I Men's Soccer Championship

References 

tournament 2015
Summit League Men's Soccer
Summit League Men's Soccer Tournament